Rina Thieleke (born 13 November 1987) is a German former competitive ice dancer.  With partner Sascha Rabe, she placed 12th at the 2005 World Junior Championships and won the silver medal at the 2005 SBC Trophy. Earlier in her career, she competed with Paul Boll.

Programs 
with Sascha Rabe

Results 
with Sascha Rabe

References

External links

 

German female ice dancers
1987 births
Living people
Figure skaters from Berlin